3-Acetyl-6-methoxybenzaldehyde is a chemical compound found in the leaves of Encelia farinosa.

References

Benzaldehydes
Piceol ethers